Murugan Idli Shop is a chain of restaurants, founded in the city of Madurai in Tamil Nadu, India. It specializes in Idli. The chain has seventeen restaurants in Chennai, three restaurants in Madurai and two in Singapore.

History 

Originally named "Murugan Coffee Nilayam," the original Madurai branch only served coffee, snacks, and idlis. In 1991, the new owner of the restaurant changed its name and significantly expanded the menu. The first Chennai branch was subsequently established in 2003.

In 2019,the licence of its central kitchen based at Ambattur Industrial Estate was suspended due to unhygenic and adverse sanitary conditions. Additionally, on a complaint filed by a customer, notice was issued by officials from the Chennai division of the Department of Food Safety and Drugs Administration to a Murugan Idli Shop outlet located at Parry’s Corner.

See also 
 List of vegetarian restaurants

References

External links 
 Murugan Idli Kadai Site - Murugan Foods Private Ltd

Restaurants in Chennai
Fast-food chains of Singapore
Restaurant chains in Singapore
Economy of Madurai
Companies based in Madurai
Companies based in Tamil Nadu
Tamil cuisine
Restaurant chains in India
Vegetarian restaurants in Singapore
Companies with year of establishment missing